Nemanja Andrić (born 13 June 1987) is a Serbian football midfielder who plays for Kolubara.

He has been playing with Rad since 2005, when he came from another Belgrade's club, FK Obilić.

Club statistics

Updated to games played as of 2 June 2018.

External sources
 Profile and stats at Srbijafudbal.
 Nemanja Andrić Stats at Utakmica.rs

1987 births
Living people
Footballers from Belgrade
Serbian footballers
Association football midfielders
FK Obilić players
FK Rad players
Győri ETO FC players
Újpest FC players
Balmazújvárosi FC players
Kaposvári Rákóczi FC players
FK Kolubara players
Serbian SuperLiga players
Nemzeti Bajnokság I players
Nemzeti Bajnokság II players
Serbian expatriate footballers
Expatriate footballers in Hungary
Serbian expatriate sportspeople in Hungary